This is a list of laser topics.

A
 3D printing, additive manufacturing
 Abnormal reflection
 Above-threshold ionization
 Absorption spectroscopy
 Accelerator physics
 Acoustic microscopy
 Acousto-optic deflector
 Acousto-optic modulator
 Acousto-optical spectrometer
 Acousto-optics
 Active laser medium
 Active optics
 Advanced Precision Kill Weapon System
 Advanced Tactical Laser
 Afocal system
 Airborne laser
 Airborne wind turbine
 Airy beam
 ALKA
 All gas-phase iodine laser
 Ambient ionization
 Amplified spontaneous emission
 Analytical chemistry
 Aneutronic fusion
 Antiproton Decelerator
 Apache Arrowhead
 Apache Point Observatory Lunar Laser-ranging Operation
 Arago spot
 Argon fluoride laser
 Argus laser
 Asterix IV laser
 Astrophysical maser
 Atmospheric-pressure laser ionization
 Atom interferometer
 Atom laser
 Atom probe
 Atomic clock
 Atomic coherence
 Atomic fountain
 Atomic line filter
 Atomic ratio
 Atomic spectroscopy
 Atomic vapor laser isotope separation
 Audience scanning
 Autler–Townes effect
 Autologous patient-specific tumor antigen response
 Automated guided vehicle
 Autonomous cruise control system
 Avalanche photodiode
 Axicon

B
 Babinet's principle
 Ballistic photon
 Bandwidth-limited pulse
 Bandwidth (signal processing)
 Barcode reader
 Basir
 Beam-powered propulsion
 Beam diameter
 Beam dump
 Beam expander
 Beam homogenizer
 Beam parameter product
 Beamz
 Big Bang Observer
 Biophotonics
 Biosensor
 Black silicon
 Blood irradiation therapy
 Blu-ray Disc
 Blue laser
 Boeing Laser Avenger
 Boeing NC-135
 Boeing YAL-1
 Bubblegram

C
 CLidar
 CALIPSO, Cloud-Aerosol Lidar and Infrared Pathfinder Satellite Observations
 Calligraphic projection
 Calutron
 Carbon dioxide laser
 Carrier generation and recombination
 Catastrophic optical damage
 Cauterization
 Cavity ring-down laser absorption spectroscopy
 Ceilometer
 Chaos in optical systems
 Chemical laser
 Chemical oxygen iodine laser
 Chirped mirror
 Chirped pulse amplification
 Clementine (spacecraft)
 Cloud seeding
 Coherence (physics)
 Coherence length
 Coherence time
 Coherent addition
 Coherent anti-Stokes Raman spectroscopy
 Coherent backscattering
 Coherent perfect absorber, anti-laser
 Coherent spectroscopy
 Collimator
 Colloidal crystal
 Color LaserWriter
 Color engraving
 Common Infrared Countermeasures program
 Compact Disc player
 Compatible Toner Cartridge
 Computed tomography laser mammography
 Computer Output to Laser Disc
 Confocal laser scanning microscopy
 Confocal microscopy
 Containment field
 Continuous scan laser Doppler vibrometry
 Continuous wave
 Coordinate-measuring machine
 Copper vapor laser
 Core/Shell Semiconductor Nanocrystals
 Corneal Waveform technology
 Coupling parameter
 Crystal oven
 Cyclic ozone
 Cyclops laser

D
 Dark state
 David Laserscanner
 Dazer Laser
 Dazzler (weapon)
 Defence Research and Development Organisation
 Delayed extraction
 Dental laser
 Detonator
 Diamond anvil cell
 Diamond blade
 Diamond enhancement
 Diamond turning
 Dichroic filter
 Dielectric mirror
 Diffractive beam splitter
 Digital holographic microscopy
 Diode-pumped solid-state laser
 Dipole trap
 Direct laser lithography
 Direct metal laser sintering
 Directed-energy weapon
 Disk laser
 Dispersive prism
 Distributed Bragg reflector
 Distributed acoustic sensing
 Distributed feedback laser
 Distributed temperature sensing
 Dopant
 Doppler cooling limit
 Double-clad fiber
 Double-density compact disc
 Double-slit experiment
 Dual polarization interferometry
 Dumpy level
 Dye laser
 Dynamic Laser Cruise Control
 Dynamic light scattering

E
 Electric spark
 Electro-absorption modulator
 Electro-optic modulator
 Electrolaser
 Electromagnetic radiation
 Electromagnetically induced grating
 Electromagnetically induced transparency
 Electronic countermeasure
 Electronic speckle pattern interferometry
 Electrophoretic light scattering
 Electrophotography
 Electrostatic-sensitive device
 Encircled energy
 Encyclopedia of Laser Physics and Technology
 Endovenous laser treatment
 Energy transfer upconversion
 Enriched uranium
 European x-ray free electron laser
 Evolutionary Air and Space Global Laser Engagement
 Excimer laser
 Extensometer
 Extinction cross
 Extinction ratio
 Extreme Light Infrastructure
 Extreme ultraviolet
 Extreme ultraviolet lithography
 Eye surgery
 Eye testing using speckle

F
 FILAT, Forward-looking Infrared and Laser Attack Targeting
 FLASH
 FROG
 Fabrication (metal)
 Fabry–Pérot interferometer
 Far-infrared laser
 Fast atom bombardment
 Femtolab
 Femtosecond Lenticule EXtraction
 Femtosecond laser intrastromal vision correction
 Femtosecond pulse shaping
 Fiber Bragg grating
 Fiber disk laser
 Fiber laser
 Fibre optic gyroscope
 Field-Map
 Figure-8 laser
 Filament propagation
 Fire-and-forget
 Firearm microstamping
 Fixed-point laser sensors
 Flash photolysis
 Flashtube
 Flow cytometry
 Fluorescence cross-correlation spectroscopy
 Fluorescence spectroscopy
 Forced Rayleigh scattering
 Fourier domain mode locking
 4Pi microscope, a laser scanning fluorescence microscope
 Frame-dragging
 Fraunhofer diffraction
 Free-electron laser
 Free-space optical communication
 Frequency Addition Source of Optical Radiation
 Frequency agility
 Frequency comb
 Frequency-resolved optical gating
 Fuser
 Fusion power
 Fusion splicing

G
 GBU-44/B Viper Strike
 GEKKO XII
 GRENOUILLE
 Gain-switching
 Gain (lasers)
 Galvanometer
 Gamma ray laser
 Gamut
 Gas centrifuge
 Gas dynamic laser
 Gas laser
 Gaser, Gamma Amplification by Stimulated Emission of Radiation
 Gaussian beam
 Geoscience Laser Altimeter System
 Glan–laser prism
 Goniometer
 Grating-eliminated no-nonsense observation of ultrafast incident laser light e-fields, GRENOUILLE
 Grating light valve
 Gravitational wave
 Gravitational wave detector
 Gravity laser
 Guidance system
 Guided Advanced Tactical Rocket – Laser

H
 HDSS
 HD DVD
 HELRAM
 HP LaserJet
 Handheld projector
 Hateruma class patrol vessel
 Heat-affected zone
 Heat treating
 Helium–neon laser
 Heterodyne
 Heterojunction
 HiPER
 High-altitude wind power
 High Energy Liquid Laser Area Defense System
 High Harmonic Generation
 Holographic Versatile Disc
 Holographic drive
 Holographic grating
 Holographic weapon sight
 Holography
 Holometer
 Homodyne detection
 Homogeneous broadening
 Horizon Laser Vision Center Classic
 Hybrid silicon laser
 Hydrodynamic focusing
 Hydrogen fluoride laser
 Hydroxyl tagging velocimetry

I
 Ion laser

J
 Janus laser

K
 KALI (laser)
 Kerr-lens modelocking
 Kerr effect
 Keyence
 Krasnopol (Weapon)
 Krypton fluoride laser

L
 LAM, Laser Assisted Myringotomy
 LANTIRN, Low Altitude Navigation and Targeting Infrared for Night
 LARES (satellite)
 LCA-Vision
 LCGT
 LED printer
 LFA, Laser flash analysis
 LIDAR, Laser Imaging Detection and Ranging)
 LIDAR speed gun
 LISA Pathfinder
 LITENING targeting pod
 LLM01
 LOMAK, Light Operated Mouse And Keyboard
 LPKF Laser & Electronics
 LT PGB
 LULI
 LULI2000
 LaSer UK
 Laboratory for Laser Energetics
 Laminated object manufacturing
 Laser
 Laser-assisted new attachment procedure
 Laser-based angle-resolved photoemission spectroscopy
 Laser-doppler flowmetry
 Laser-guided bomb
 Laser-heated pedestal growth
 Laser-hybrid welding
 Laser-induced breakdown spectroscopy
 Laser-induced fluorescence
 Laser ablation
 Laser ablation electrospray ionization
 Laser ablation synthesis in solution
 Laser absorption spectrometry
 Laser accelerometer
 Laser acronyms
 Laser aiming module
 Laser airborne depth sounder
 Laser Arena
 Laser assisted parking
 Laser beam divergence
 Laser beam machining
 Laser beam profiler
 Laser beam quality
 Laser beam riding
 Laser blended vision
 Laser bridge
 Laser broom
 Laser camera system
 Laser cannon
 Laser cautery
 Laser coagulation
 Laser communication
 Laser construction
 Laser converting
 Laser cooling
 Laser crystal
 Laser cutting
 Laser dazzler
 Laser designator
 Laser Design, Inc.
 Laser detector
 Laser detuning
 Laser diffraction analysis
 Laser diode
 Laser diode rate equations
 Laser Doppler velocimetry
 Laser Doppler vibrometer
 Laser drilling
 Laser dynamic range imager
 Laser Electrical
 Laser engraving
 Laser extensometer
 Laser eye surgery
 Laser fence
 Laser flash analysis
 Laser Focus World
 Laser fusion
 Laser Geodynamics Satellites, LAGEOS
 Laser Ghost
 Laser glass sculpture
 Laser guidance
 Laser guide star
 Laser guns
 Laser hair removal
 Laser harp
 Laser heater
 Laser imaging
 Laser inertial fusion energy
 Laser Interferometer Gravitational-Wave Observatory, LIGO
 Laser injection
 Laser integration line
 Laser keyboard
 Laser level
 Laser levitation
 Laser light show (Grand Coulee Dam)
 Laser light shows
 Laser line level
 Laser linewidth
 Laser lithotripsy
 Laser machine control
 Laser medicine
 Laser Mégajoule
 Laser melting
 Laser mouse
 Laser microjet
 Laser microphone
 Laser microprobe mass spectrometry
 Laser microscopy
 Laser mode
 Laser oscillation
 Laser photoplotter
 Laser pistol
 Laser plasma acceleration
 Laser pointer
 Laser power beaming
 Laser printer
 Laser propulsion
 Laser protection eyewear
 Laser Radial
 Laser radial keratotomy
 Laser rangefinder
 Laser rapid manufacturing
 Laser reflecting goniometer
 Laser resurfacing
 Laser rot
 Laser safety
 Laser scalpel
 Laser scanner
 Laser scanning
 Laser science
 Laser Science and Technology Centre
 Laser shaft alignment
 Laser shock
 Laser sight
 Laser snow
 Laser soldering
 Laser speckle
 Laser spectroscopy
 Laser spray ionization
 Laser Stratos
 Laser surface velocimeter
 Laser survey
 Laser sword
 Laser table
 Laser tag
 Laser thermal keratoplasty
 Laser thermometer
 Laser trackers
 Laser trimming
 Laser turntable
 Laser tweezer
 Laser vaginal rejuvenation
 Laser video display
 Laser video projector
 Laser voltage prober
 Laserblast
 Laserdisc
 Laserfection
 Laserfilm
 LaserLock
 LaserMotive
 LaserScope
 Lasgun
 LASIK (laser-assisted in situ keratomileusis)
 Lasing threshold
 Laspistol
 Light
 Light-emitting diode
 LightScribe
 Light beam
 Light dressed state
 Light gun
 Light induced voltage alteration
 Light pulse generator
 Light therapy
 Lightcraft
 Lightning
 Line laser
 Liposuction
 Liquid Sky (effect)
 Liquid crystal
 Liquid crystal laser
 List of laser applications
 List of laser types
 Lloyd's mirror
 Lockheed Martin Sniper XR
 Logitech VX Revolution
 Long path laser
 Longitudinal mode
 Low-angle laser light scattering
 Low level laser therapy
 Lunar Laser Ranging experiment
 Lyot filter

M
 MALDI imaging
 MEMS magnetic field sensor
 MESSENGER
 MIRACL
 M squared
 Madison Symmetric Torus
 Magnetized target fusion
 Magneto-optic Kerr effect
 Magneto-optical drive
 Magneto-optical trap
 Manipulation of atoms by optical field
 Mars Global Surveyor
 Mars Laser Communication Demonstration
 Mars Orbiter Laser Altimeter
 Marvin (robot)
 Maser
 Matrix-assisted laser desorption/ionization
 McCumber relation
 Megamaser
 Mercury laser
 Metal aromaticity
 Michelson interferometer
 Microplasma
 Microprobe
 Microscale thermophoresis
 Mirror
 Mirror galvanometer
 Mirror mount
 Missile guidance
 Mobile Tactical High-Energy Laser
 Mode-locking
 Mode coupling
 Mode scrambler
 Modulating retro-reflector
 Molecular laser isotope separation
 Molecular tagging velocimetry
 Monochromator
 Moore's law
 Mosquito laser
 Motion detection
 Multiangle light scattering
 Multifocal multiphoton microscopy
 Multiphase topology optimisation
 Multiphoton intrapulse interference phase scan
 Multiple-prism dispersion theory
 Multiple-prism grating laser oscillator
 Multiple Integrated Laser Engagement System

N
 N-slit interferometer
 N-slit interferometric equation
 NRLMSISE-00
 Nanoimpellers
 Nanolaser
 Nanoneedle
 Nanosecond
 Nanosight
 National Ignition Facility
 Nd:YAG laser
 Nd:glass laser
 NeXT Laser Printer
 Near-field scanning optical microscope
 Negative temperature
 Neutral density filter
 Newton's flaming laser sword
 Nicoll-Dyson Laser
 Nike laser
 Nitrogen laser
 Noble gas
 Noise-immune cavity-enhanced optical heterodyne molecular spectroscopy
 Non-ionizing radiation
 Nonlinear optics
 Novette laser
 Nuclear fusion-fission hybrid
 Nuclear photonic rocket
 Nuclear pumped laser
 Numerical aperture

O
 OMAC Laser 300
 Open fiber control
 Optical Express
 Optical amplifier
 Optical autocorrelation
 Optical beam dump
 Optical beam induced current
 Optical bistability
 Optical cavity
 Optical coherence tomography
 Optical cross section
 Optical decay
 Optical dilatometer
 Optical disc drive
 Optical downconverter
 Optical feedback
 Optical heterodyne detection
 Optical imaging
 Optical interferometry
 Optical lattice
 Optical lift
 Optical media preservation
 Optical microcavity
 Optical modulation amplitude
 Optical modulator
 Optical molasses
 Optical parametric amplifier
 Optical parametric oscillator
 Optical power budget
 Optical pumping
 Optical recording
 Optical ring resonators
 Optical storage
 Optical table
 Optical tape
 Optical train
 Optical tweezers
 Optimax
 Optimized Power Control
 Orbiter Boom Sensor System
 Organic photorefractive materials
 Ormosil
 Oscillator linewidth
 Output coupler

P
 PDLCT
 PITZ
 PPCT
 PVLAS
 Particle-size distribution
 Particle accelerator
 Particle counter
 Particle image velocimetry
 Particle tracking velocimetry
 Pascal Photocoagulator
 Paser
 Pauli exclusion principle
 Pave Spike
 Pave Tack
 Paveway
 Penning trap
 Peresvet
 Personnel Detection Device
 Peter Harrison Planetarium, is a 120-seat digital laser planetarium
 Phased-array optics
 PHASR, Personnel halting and stimulation response rifle
 Phoenix (spacecraft)
 Photoablation
 Photoconductive atomic force microscopy
 Photodarkening
 Photodissociation
 Photodynamic therapy
 Photoelectrochemical processes
 Photoemission spectroscopy
 Photoflash capacitor
 Photofragment-ion imaging
 Photoionization mode
 Photolithography
 Photomixing
 Photon
 Photon Doppler velocimetry
 Photon antibunching
 Photonic-crystal fiber
 Photonic force microscope
 Photonic integrated circuit
 Photonics
 Photonics Spectra
 Photophoresis
 Photoplotter
 Photorefractive effect
 Photothermal effect
 Photothermal spectroscopy
 Planar Doppler velocimetry
 Planar laser-induced fluorescence
 Planetarium projector
 Plasma Acoustic Shield System
 Plasma acceleration
 Plasma channel
 Plasma cutting
 Plasma stealth
 Plasma weapon
 Plastic surgery
 Platesetter
 Plymouth Laser
 Point-to-point laser technology (PPLT)
 Polariton laser
 Polarization ripples
 Polyus (spacecraft)
 Ponderomotive energy
 Population inversion
 Potassium titanyl phosphate
 Pound–Drever–Hall technique
 Power scaling
 Precision-guided munition
 Precision bombing
 Precrash system
 Printed circuit board
 Prism coupler
 Projection keyboard
 Protocol on Blinding Laser Weapons
 Pulsed laser
 Pulse repetition frequency
 Pulsed Energy Projectile, Pulsed Impulsive Kill Laser
 Pulsed energy weapon
 Pulsed laser deposition
 Pulsed power
 Pursuit guidance

Q
 Q-switching
 Q factor
 Quantapoint
 Quantum amplifier
 Quantum cascade laser
 Quantum clock
 Quantum defect
 Quantum dot
 Quantum dot laser
 Quantum heterostructure
 Quantum imaging
 Quantum limit
 Quantum noise
 Quantum tomography
 Quantum well
 Quantum well laser
 Quenching (fluorescence)

R
 Radar
 Radar detector
 Radar gun
 Radial polarization
 Rail inspection
 Rainbow hologram
 Raman cooling
 Raman laser
 Raman microscope
 Raman scattering
 Random laser
 Range imaging
 Rangefinder
 Rare-earth element
 Rave
 Ray transfer matrix analysis
 Raygun
 Rayleigh length
 Reciprocity (photography)
 Recoil temperature
 Reference beam
 Reflectron
 Refrigeration
 Regenerative amplification
 Relative fluorescence units
 Relative intensity noise
 Relativistic electron beam
 Relativistic heat conduction
 Relativistic similarity parameter
 Resolution enhancement technology
 Resolved sideband cooling
 Resonance Raman spectroscopy
 Resonance enhanced multiphoton ionization
 Ring laser
 Ring laser gyroscope
 Rocket-assisted projectile
 Roketsan Cirit
 Ruby laser
 Rydberg ionization spectroscopy
 Rydberg molecule
 Rydberg state
 Rytov number

S
 SCALPEL, Small Contained-Area Laser Precision Energetic Load
 SEAgel
 SWEEPNIK
 Sagnac effect
 SASER, Sound Amplification by Stimulated Emission of Radiation
 Satellite geodesy
 Satellite laser ranging
 Saturated absorption
 Saturated spectroscopy
 Scanning laser ophthalmoscopy
 Scanning voltage microscopy
 Scattering from rough surfaces
 Second-harmonic generation
 Second-harmonic imaging microscopy
 Security seal
 Selective laser melting
 Selective laser sintering
 Self-amplified stimulated emission
 Self-focusing
 Self-mixing interferometry
 Self-phase modulation
 Self-pulsation
 Semiconductor ring laser
 Sensor based sorting
 Serial time-encoded amplified microscopy (STEAM)
 Shearography
 Shielding gas
 Shiva laser
 Shtora
 Sight (device)
 Signal beam
 Silex Process
 Sim scanner
 Single photon sources
 Sisyphus cooling
 Sisyphus effect
 Skin whitening
 Skyguard (airport defense system)
 Slapper detonator
 Slope efficiency
 Smith–Purcell effect
 Smoke detector
 Smoke screen
 Sniper
 Soft-tissue laser surgery
 Soft laser desorption
 Solar-pumped laser
 Solar sail
 Solid-state laser
 Solid-state dye laser
 Soviet laser pistol
 Space-based solar power
 Space debris
 Spaser, Surface plasmon amplification by stimulated emission of radiation
 Spatial filter
 Spatial light modulator
 Spatially Encoded Arrangement for SPIDER
 Speckle pattern
 Spectral hole burning
 Spectrometer
 Spectroscopy
 Speed limit enforcement
 Spontaneous emission

 Stage lighting
 Starfire Optical Range
 Starstreak (missile)
 Static light scattering
 Stealth aircraft
 Stealth technology
 Stereoscopy
 Stimulated emission
 Strainmeter
 Strategic Defense Initiative
 Streamlight
 Strong confinement limit
 Strontium vapor laser
 Structured-light 3D scanner
 Sum-frequency generation
 Sum frequency generation spectroscopy
 Super resolution microscopy
 Supercontinuum
 Supercritical angle fluorescence microscopy
 Superluminescent diode
 Superradiance
 Surface-assisted laser desorption/ionization
 Surround optical-fiber immunoassay (SOFIA)
 SwissFEL
 Synchrotron light source
 Synthetic aperture radar
 Synthetic diamond

T
 TEA laser
 TIALD, Thermal Imaging Airborne Laser Designator Pod
 Tactical High Energy Laser
 Tactical light
 Talbot cavity
 Targeting (warfare)
 Targeting pods
 Taser
 Terahertz radiation
 Terahertz time-domain spectroscopy
 Terra-3
 Tetracene
 Theatrical smoke and fog
 Theodolite
 Thermal blooming
 Thermal laser stimulation
 Thermal shock parameter in the physics of solid-state lasers
 Thermopile laser sensor
 Thin film
 Three-level laser
 Ti:sapphire laser
 Time-of-flight camera
 Time-of-flight mass spectrometry
 Time-resolved spectroscopy
 Time of flight
 Titan laser
 Toda oscillator
 Toner
 Toner cartridge
 Toner refill
 Tophat beam
 Trabeculoplasty
 Track and trace
 Transistor laser
 Transoral laser microsurgery
 Transparency and translucency
 Transparent ceramics
 Transverse mode
 TriDAR
 Trident laser
 Trotec
 Tunable diode laser absorption spectroscopy
 Tunable laser
 Turbulent diffusion
 Two-dimensional infrared spectroscopy
 Two-photon absorption
 Two-photon excitation microscopy
 Type 87 Chu-MAT

U
 Ultra Density Optical disk format
 Ultracold atom
 Ultrafast laser spectroscopy
 Ultrafast monochromator
 Ultralase
 Ultrashort pulse
 Ultrashort pulse laser
 Ultrasonic flow meter
 Ultraviolet
 Undulator

V
 VORPAL
 VTech Laser 200
 Vector soliton fiber laser with atomic layer graphene
 Veiling-glare laser
 Verdet constant
 Vertical-cavity surface-emitting laser
 Vertical-external-cavity surface-emitting-laser
 Videodisc
 Videometer
 Virgo interferometer
 Visotek
 Volume hologram
 Vulcan laser

W
 Wall-plug efficiency
 Warm dense matter
 Waveguide (optics)
 Wavelength-division multiplexing
 Weapon effects simulation
 Wideband materials
 Wireless energy transfer

X
 X-ray
 X-ray laser
 Xenon chloride laser
 Xerox

Y
 Yb:LuVO4

Z
 ZETA (fusion reactor)
 ZEUS-HLONS (HMMWV Laser Ordnance Neutralization System)
 Zeeman slower
 Zerona

See also

References

 
Laser
Laser